Sebastian Rode (born 11 October 1990) is a German professional footballer who plays as a midfielder for Bundesliga club Eintracht Frankfurt.

Career

Kickers Offenbach
Rode made his professional debut for Kickers Offenbach on 7 March 2009 in the 3. Liga – the third tier of German football –  against Eintracht Braunschweig.

Eintracht Frankfurt
On 3 June 2010, he left Kickers Offenbach and signed for Eintracht Frankfurt. He made his first appearance in an UEFA Europa League game against Qarabağ FK on 22 August 2013.

Bayern Munich

On 14 April 2014, Rode signed a pre-contract with Bayern Munich to join them on 1 July 2014 at the end of his contract with Eintracht Frankfurt. He made his debut against Borussia Dortmund in the German Supercup. On 22 November 2014, he scored his first goal for Bayern in home game win against Hoffenheim.The match ended 4–0. Aiding in a Champions League group stage match against CSKA Moscow, Rode scored a header from a corner kick, putting Bayern up 2–0 in a match that would end at 3–0 with CSKA Moscow being knocked out.

Borussia Dortmund

2016–2018

On 6 June 2016, Rode signed a four-year contract with Borussia Dortmund. On 14 August 2016, Rode made his debut in 2–0 defeat against his former team, Bayern Munich in the DFL-Supercup. Rode finished his first season at Dortmund with a goal in 21 matches. Rode started the 2017–18 season by losing the German Super Cup. He did not make any Bundesliga or DFB-Pokal appearances during the 2017–18 season. He made two appearances for Borussia Dortmund II in the Regionalliga West during the 2018–19 Regionalliga season.

Loan to Eintracht Frankfurt
In the 2018–19 winter transfer window, he was loaned out to Eintracht Frankfurt until the end of the season.

Return to Eintracht Frankfurt

On 27 July 2019, Rode rejoined Eintracht Frankfurt on a five-year deal following a successful loan spell at the club in the second half of the 2018–19 season.

International career
Rode has represented Germany at U18,  U19, U20, and U21 level.

Personal life
Rode earned his Abitur in 2010 in the Goethe Gymnasium in Bensheim.

Career statistics

Honours

Club
Bayern Munich
 Bundesliga: 2014–15, 2015–16
 DFB-Pokal: 2015–16

Borussia Dortmund
 DFB-Pokal: 2016–17

Eintracht Frankfurt
UEFA Europa League: 2021–22

References

External links

 
 

1990 births
Living people
German footballers
SV Darmstadt 98 players
Association football midfielders
Kickers Offenbach players
Eintracht Frankfurt players
Eintracht Frankfurt II players
FC Bayern Munich footballers
UEFA Europa League winning players
Bundesliga players
2. Bundesliga players
3. Liga players
Germany youth international footballers
Germany under-21 international footballers
People from Darmstadt-Dieburg
Sportspeople from Darmstadt (region)
Borussia Dortmund players
Footballers from Hesse